Coleophora acrisella is a moth of the family Coleophoridae. It is found from the Czech Republic to the Iberian Peninsula, Italy and Greece and from France to Hungary.

The wingspan is about 12 mm.

The larvae feed on Dorycnium hirsutum and Dorycnium pentaphyllum (including Dorycnium pentaphyllum germanicum). They mine the leaves of their host plant. They create a strongly arched composite leaf case of 7–8 mm. The case consists of a number of mined leaflets placed transversely on top of each other, resulting in a somewhat helicoidal case. The mouth opening is located more or less to the side. The larvae can be found on the underside of the leaves. There are often several larvae on the same leaflet.

Part of the larvae develop into adults before summer, another group of adults emerges in autumn and a third group hibernates and produces adults after winter.

References

acrisella
Moths described in 1872
Moths of Europe